Back from the Dead may refer to:

Back from the Dead (Adler album), 2012
Back from the Dead (film), a 1957 feature film with Arthur Franz and Marsha Hunt
Back from the Dead (Halestorm album), 2022
Back from the Dead (Obituary album), 1997
Back from the Dead (Spinal Tap album), 2009
Back from the Dead (Zombie Girl EP), 2006
Back from the Dead (Last Dinosaurs EP), 2010
"Back from the Dead" (Kid Rock song)
Back from the Dead (mixtape), Chief Keef mixtape

See also
Resurrection, refers to the literal coming back to life of the biologically dead